Zeirath is a ghost town in eastern Jasper County, Texas, United States. The town was located along the Gulf, Beaumont and Kansas City railroad between Jasper and Kirbyville. It disappeared sometime in the 1920s.

References

Ghost towns in East Texas
Geography of Jasper County, Texas